Mount Union Historic District is a national historic district located at Mount Union in Huntingdon County, Pennsylvania. The district includes 58 contributing buildings, 3 contributing sites, and 1 contributing structure in the central business district and surrounding residential areas of Mount Union.  Notable buildings include the Federal-style John Shaver House (1818), Shapiro Theater (1915), T.A. Appleby Store and House (c. 1870), Kenmar Hotel (1880s, 1904), Penn Central National Bank (1916), Peduzzi's and the Weller Building (1913-1914), Pennsylvania Railroad Freight Depot (1914), St. Luke's Evangelical Lutheran Church (1904-1905), First United Methodist Church (1925-1926), St. Catherine of Siena Roman Catholic Church (1912-1913), Mount Union Elementary School (1923-1924), and U.S. Post Office (1936).  The contributing sites include the I.O.O.F. community cemetery, founded in 1872, and the former Victoria Park.  Located in the district and listed separately is the Harbison-Walker Refractories Company complex.

It was listed on the National Register of Historic Places in 1994.

References

External links
All of the following are located in Mount Union, Huntingdon County, PA:

Historic American Buildings Survey in Pennsylvania
Historic districts on the National Register of Historic Places in Pennsylvania
Federal architecture in Pennsylvania
Historic districts in Huntingdon County, Pennsylvania
National Register of Historic Places in Huntingdon County, Pennsylvania